The 2017 ITU World Triathlon Series was a series of nine World Championship Triathlon events that lead up to a Grand Final held in Rotterdam. The Series was organised under the auspices of the world governing body of triathlon, the International Triathlon Union (ITU).

Calendar

Results

Medal summary

Men

Women

Overall standings
The athlete who accumulates the most points throughout the 8 race season is declared the year's world champion. The final point standings are:

Men

Women

References

External links
ITU Rankings
Media Guide

2017
World Triathlon Series